Fritz Imhoff, real name: Friedrich Arnold Heinrich Jeschke (January 6, 1891, Alsergrund  February 24, 1961, Wieden) was an Austrian actor. He was a brother of the Wienerlied composer  (18901962).

Selected filmography 
 Daughter of the Regiment (1933)
 Leap into Bliss (1934)
 Spring Parade (1934)
 Nocturne (1934)
 Episode (1935)
 Everything for the Company (1935)
 Suburban Cabaret (1935)
 The Cossack and the Nightingale (1935)
 The Emperor's Candlesticks (1936)
 Where the Lark Sings (1936)
 The Postman from Longjumeau (1936)
 Catherine the Last (1936)
 Romance (1936)
 Thank You, Madame (1936)
 Lumpaci the Vagabond (1936)
 Silhouetten (1936)
 Rendezvous in Wien (1936)
 Millionäre (1937)
 The Charm of La Boheme (1937)
 Roxy and the Wonderteam (1938)
 Little County Court (1938)
 Linen from Ireland (1939)
 Immortal Waltz (1939)
 Hotel Sacher (1939)
 A Mother's Love (1939)
 Vienna Tales (1940)
 Love is Duty Free (1941)
 The Secret Countess (1942)
 Whom the Gods Love (1942)
 Vienna Blood (1942)
 Two Happy People (1943)
 The White Dream (1943)
 Schrammeln (1944)
 Viennese Girls (1945)
 The Mozart Story (1948)
 The Heavenly Waltz (1948)
 Cordula (1950)
 The Fourth Commandment (1950)
 Call Over the Air (1951)
  The Dubarry (1951)
  Knall and Fall as Imposters  (1952)
 Season in Salzburg (1952)
 1. April 2000 (1952)
  That Can Happen to Anyone (1952)
  To Be Without Worries (1953)
 Grandstand for General Staff (1953)
 Lavender (1953)
 Franz Schubert (1953)
 The Spendthrift (1953)
 Arena of Death (1953)
 The Big Star Parade (1954)
 The Three from the Filling Station (1955)
 Royal Hunt in Ischl (1955)
  My Aunt, Your Aunt (1956)
 Love, Girls and Soldiers (1958)
 The Good Soldier Schweik (1960)
 Guitars Sound Softly Through the Night (1960)

External links 
 

1891 births
1961 deaths
20th-century Austrian male actors
Austrian male film actors
Male actors from Vienna
People from Alsergrund
People from Wieden